Crassanapis is a genus of South American araneomorph spiders in the family Anapidae, first described by Norman I. Platnick & Raymond Robert Forster in 1989.

Species
 it contains five species:
Crassanapis calderoni Platnick & Forster, 1989 – Chile
Crassanapis cekalovici Platnick & Forster, 1989 – Chile, Argentina
Crassanapis chaiten Platnick & Forster, 1989 – Chile
Crassanapis chilensis Platnick & Forster, 1989 – Chile
Crassanapis contulmo Platnick & Forster, 1989 – Chile

References

Anapidae
Araneomorphae genera
Spiders of South America
Taxa named by Raymond Robert Forster